The 22149 / 22150 Pune–Ernakulam Superfast Express is a Express train service operated by Central Railways that runs between Pune Junction in Maharashtra and Ernakulam Junction in Kerala, via Konkan Railway, Panvel route.
The train is numbered 22149/22150 for the journey between Ernakulam and Pune.

Route & Halts

Traction

Direction reversal
The train reverses its direction once at;

 .

Rake sharing
The train sharing its rake with 11097/11098 Poorna Express.

External links
  at indiarailinfo.com

Express trains in India
Rail transport in Maharashtra
Rail transport in Kerala
Rail transport in Goa
Rail transport in Karnataka
Transport in Pune
Transport in Kochi